Kenneth Shine may refer to:

Kenneth Shine (dean), see David Geffen School of Medicine at UCLA
Kenneth Shine, character in The Alphabet Killer
Ken Shine, Australian rugby league football coach